The Blood of Lorraine, the second crime novel by Barbara Corrado Pope, is set in France during the Belle Époque.

Critical reception 
Critics have reviewed The Blood of Lorraine favorably. Deborah Schoeneman of the Jewish Book Council wrote it is " a fascinating read, exploring religious, social, and political thinking, propaganda, and prejudice". Kirkus review reported it "gracefully transports the reader to its liveried era and broadens the story’s appeal with characters of substance and depth". Publishers Weekly concluded, "Pope, a historian, more than compensates for a not fully satisfying ending with a complex lead and the skill with which she makes the anti-Semitic atmosphere of the times both palpable and tragically prophetic."

See also 
 Cézanne’s Quarry
 The Missing Italian Girl

References

External links 
 

American crime novels
Books by Barbara Corrado Pope
Belle Époque